Felix Benda (25 February 1708 – 1768) was a Bohemian composer and organist. He was not a member of the Benda musical family.

Benda was born in Skalsko.  He was a student of Bohuslav Matěj Černohorský. In 1726 he became an organist at the Michaelskirche in Prague (succeeding Šimon Brixi). His works, not published during his lifetime, demonstrate his profound knowledge in counterpoint. They include a requiem mass, organ masses, two oratorios, and other church music.

Benda's students included Josef Mysliveček and Josef Seger.

He died in Prague in 1768.

See also 
 Benda (surname)

References 

1708 births
1768 deaths
Czech Baroque composers
Czech male classical composers
Czech classical organists
Male classical organists
18th-century classical composers
18th-century male musicians
18th-century musicians
18th-century keyboardists
18th-century Bohemian musicians